is Jinn's second single release. It was released on November 22, 2006, and reached number 84 on the Oricon charts in Japan.

Track listing

2006 singles
Jinn (band) songs
2006 songs